Skhirate-Témara is a prefecture of Morocco in the Rabat-Salé-Kénitra region. The prefecture capital is the city of Temara, itself a suburb of Rabat.

Subdivisions
The province is divided administratively into the following:

References